White Chapel or Grace Chapel is a historic church on Rossview Road in Rossview, Tennessee.

It was established in the 1860s as a mission Sunday school for local children and served all Christian denominations. The frame building that houses the church was built in 1866 and added to the National Register of Historic Places in 1986.

References

Churches in Tennessee
Churches on the National Register of Historic Places in Tennessee
Churches in Montgomery County, Tennessee
National Register of Historic Places in Montgomery County, Tennessee